Howard Nemerov (March 1, 1920 – July 5, 1991) was an American poet. He was twice Poet Laureate Consultant in Poetry to the Library of Congress, from 1963 to 1964 and again from 1988 to 1990. For The Collected Poems of Howard Nemerov (1977), he won the National Book Award for Poetry,
Pulitzer Prize for Poetry,
and Bollingen Prize.

Nemerov was brother to photographer Diane Nemerov Arbus and father to art historian Alexander Nemerov, Professor of the History of Art and American Studies at Stanford University.

Biography
Nemerov was born on March 1, 1920, in New York City; his parents were David Nemerov and Gertrude Russek. The Nemerovs were a Russian Jewish couple who lived in New York City and owned Russeks, a Fifth Avenue department store. His younger sisters were the photographer Diane Arbus and sculptor/painter Renee Nemerov Sparkia Brown.  The elder Nemerov's talents and interests extended to art connoisseurship, painting, philanthropy, and photography — talents and interests undoubtedly influential upon his son. Young Howard was raised in a sophisticated New York City environment where he attended the Society for Ethical Culture's Fieldston School. Graduated in 1937 as an outstanding student and second string team football fullback, he commenced studies at Harvard University where, in 1940, he was Bowdoin Essayist and he received bachelor's degree at this university. Throughout World War II, he served as a pilot, first in the Royal Canadian Air Force and later the U.S. Army Air Forces. He married in 1944, and after the war, having earned the rank of first lieutenant, returned to New York with his wife to complete his first book.

Nemerov then began teaching, first at Hamilton College and later at Bennington College, Brandeis University, and finally Washington University in St. Louis, where he was Edward Mallinckrodt Distinguished University Professor of English and Distinguished Poet in Residence from 1969 until his death in 1991. In 1999, Washington University dedicated a dormitory, The Howard Nemerov House, to him. Nemerov's numerous collections of poetry include Trying Conclusions: New and Selected Poems, 1961-1991 (University of Chicago Press, 1991); The Collected Poems of Howard Nemerov (1977), which won the Pulitzer Prize, the National Book Award, and the Bollingen Prize; The Winter Lightning: Selected Poems (1968); Mirrors and Windows (1958); The Salt Garden (1955); and The Image and the Law (1947). His novels have also been commended; they include The Homecoming Game (1957), Federigo: Or the Power of Love (1954), and The Melodramatists (1949).

Nemerov received many awards and honors, among them fellowships from The Academy of American Poets and The Guggenheim Foundation, a National Endowment for the Arts grant, the National Medal of Arts, the Bollingen Prize for Poetry, the St. Louis Literary Award from the Saint Louis University Library Associates, the Golden Plate Award of the American Academy of Achievement, and the first Aiken Taylor Award for Modern American Poetry.

Nemerov served as poetry consultant to the Library of Congress in 1963 and 1964, as a Chancellor of the Academy of American Poets beginning in 1976, and two terms as poet laureate of the United States from 1988 to 1990. In 1990 he was inducted into the St. Louis Walk of Fame. Nemerov died of cancer in 1991 in University City, Missouri. The Howard Nemerov Sonnet Award was instituted in 1994 to honor him, and by 2008 about 3000 sonnets were entered annually in the associated competition.

Poetry 
Nemerov's work is formalist. He wrote almost exclusively in fixed forms and meter. While he is known for his meticulousness and refined technique, his work also has a reputation for being witty and playful. He is compared to John Hollander and Philip Larkin.

"A Primer of the Daily Round" is his most frequently anthologized poem, and highly representative of Nemerov's poetic style. It is an archetypal Elizabethan sonnet, demonstrative of the prosodic creativity for which Nemerov is famous. Another widely appreciated poem is "The War in the Air," which draws on his wartime experience as a pilot.

Nemerov's "Because You Asked about the Line between Prose and Poetry" is frequently taught as an example of an Ars Poetica as it describes the nearly imperceptible change between rain and snow while still maintaining the formal poetic elements of rhyme and meter. A critical review by Mary Kinzie said of it: "the poem imperceptibly thickens itself out of the stream of prose."

Nemerov also published a short story in the book Stories Selected from  the Unexpected by Bennett Cerf under the pseudonym Joseph Cross called "Exchange of Men". http://www.philsp.com/homeville/anth/s194.htm

Bibliography

Poetry collections
The Image and the Law (1947)
Guide to the Ruins (1950)
The Vacuum (1955)
The Salt Garden (1955)
Mirrors and Windows (1958)
The Next Room of The Dream: Poems and Two Plays (1962)
The Blue Swallows (1967)
The Winter Lightning: Selected Poems (1968)
Gnomes & Occasions: Poems (1973) University of Chicago Press 
The Collected Poems of Howard Nemerov (1977)  —winner of the National Book Award, Pulitzer Prize, and Bollingen Prize
Sentences (1980) 
Inside the Onion (1984) 
War Stories: Poems about Long Ago and Now (1987) 
Trying Conclusions: New and Selected Poems, 1961-1991 (1992) 
Grace to be Said at the Supermarket
The War in the Air

Prose
The Melodramatists (1949)
Federigo: Or the Power of Love (1954)
The Homecoming Game (1957)
The Commodity of Dreams and Other Stories (1959)
Journal of the Fictive Life (1965) 
Stories, Fables and Other Diversions (1971)

Literary scholarship
The Oak in the Acorn: On Remembrance of Things Past and on Teaching Proust, Who Will Never Learn (1987)

References

External links

 Academy of American Poets - Biographical Sketch and Links to Poetry
 Poet Laureate Timeline: 1961-1970
 Poetry Foundation - Biography and Links to Poetry
The Howard Nemerov Papers at Washington University in St. Louis
 St. Louis Walk of Fame
 Howard Nemerov "Thirteen Ways of Looking at a Skylark" The Baltimore Museum of Art: Baltimore, Maryland, 1964 Accessed June 26, 2012

American Poets Laureate
American people of Russian-Jewish descent
Jewish American poets
Formalist poets
Pulitzer Prize for Poetry winners
Bollingen Prize recipients
National Book Award winners
United States National Medal of Arts recipients
Washington University in St. Louis faculty
Ethical Culture Fieldston School alumni
Harvard College alumni
Poets from Missouri
Writers from New York City
People from St. Louis County, Missouri
Deaths from cancer in Missouri
1920 births
1991 deaths
20th-century American poets
Russek family
Royal Canadian Air Force personnel of World War II
Canadian World War II pilots
United States Army Air Forces pilots of World War II
United States Army Air Forces officers